The Indian state of Nagaland currently has only one operational airport, the Dimapur Airport. The airport is operated by the Airports Authority of India and is connected to several prominent Indian cities. A new airport is also proposed to be built at the state capital Kohima to improve connectivity in Nagaland. The new airport at Kohima is proposed to be built at Chiethu, 25 kilometres from Kohima. In July 2021, the proposed airport received a no-objection certificate from the Ministry of Defence, India.

List
The list includes the airports in Nagaland with their respective ICAO and IATA codes.

References

Nagaland
Buildings and structures in Nagaland